Father's Day is a 2012 Malayalam film directed by Kalavoor Ravikumar, starring Shehin, Indu Thampy, Revathi, Lal and Shankar Panikkar in the lead roles. this is the second film from director Kalavoor Ravikumar, who earlier directed Oridathoru Puzhayundu. Oscar award winner Resul Pookutty made his acting debut through this film.

Plot
The story revolves around Seetha, a tutor in a Government College. A person continuously goes behind her, spying her and later when they both meet up, he tells that he is a Criminology student, who specializes in rapes. Seetha Lives in her niece's house. She has a caring brother, who is afraid that Seetha is not married yet. This student turns out to be her own son. He wanted to research on her history, so he collects all the relevant evidences, and starts his work. The story goes on and on, until it ends up in a DNA test. The story later revolves on how he takes revenge on the 4 rapists.

Cast
 Shehin as Joseph K. Joseph
 Indu Thampy
 Revathi as Prof. Seethalakshmi
 Lal as Seethalakshmi's suitor
 Shankar Panikkar as Ram Menon
 Idavela Babu as Abeed Ali
 Suresh Krishna
 Vijay Menon as Nobble Mathew
 Maya Viswanath as Betty Nobble Mathew
 Reena Basheer as Geetha Menon
 Vineeth as Gopan
 Jagathy Sreekumar
 Lakshmi Priya 
 K. P. A. C. Lalitha
 Chithra Shenoy as Dr. Elizabeth Thomas
 Resul Pookutty

Reception 
A critic from Rediff.com said that "Father's Day is not flawless but we can appreciate the effort it takes to make a meaningful film that tackles a difficult subject with some degree of success". A critic from Indiaglitz wrote that "Father's Day, in not a regular plot, is meant for those who like a little difference in a regular pattern of a tearjerker".

References

External links

2010s Malayalam-language films
Father's Day
Films shot in Kannur
Films shot in Thalassery
Films scored by Ouseppachan